Terence Regan (26 June 1926 – 23 October 2020) was an English footballer who played as a right winger.

Early and personal life
Regan was born in White Abbey, Bradford. He was married, with his wife dying of cancer in 1987.

Career
Regan spent time in the Army between 1945 and 1948.

Regan joined Bradford City from Salts in October 1948. He made 1 league appearance for the club, before returning to Salts in 1950. He left Bradford City after the club offered to make him a professional.

Regan later worked in the greetings card business, for Sharpes Classic and also for his own company, for 26 years.

Later life
Regan retired to Ilkley. He released his autobiography to local libraries in October 2011, at the age of 85, to raise money for charity. He died on 23 October 2020, at the age of 94.

Sources

References

1926 births
2020 deaths
English footballers
Salts F.C. players
Bradford City A.F.C. players
English Football League players
Association football wingers
People from Manningham, Bradford